Sidetracked may refer to:

 Sidetracked (1916 film), a film starring Oliver Hardy
 Sidetracked (2015 film), a Spanish comedy film
 Sidetracked (magazine), an adventure travel and extreme sports magazine
 Sidetracked (novel), a 1995 Kurt Wallander novel by Henning Mankell
 "Sidetracked" (Phineas and Ferb), a 2013 television episode
 "Sidetracked" (Wallander), a 2008 television episode
 "Sidetracked", a song by Maureen Steele from her 1985 album Nature of the Beast
 Sidetracked, a 2010 album by La Roux
 "Sidetracked", a 2010 song by Jme
 Samurai Champloo: Sidetracked, a 2006 video game based on the anime Samurai Champloo

See also
 Sidetrack (disambiguation)